Kanodar is a census town in Banaskantha district in the Indian state of Gujarat. Kanodar is situated on Palanpur-Ahmedabad State Highway 41.

Demographics 
The population is split evenly between males and females. The literacy rate of Kanodar city is 99.74 % higher than state average of 78.03 %. In Kanodar, male literacy is around 98.72 % while female literacy rate is 99.9 %.

Education 
There are four Gujarati medium primary schools, one Gujarati secondary school named S.K.M High School & D.B.W.T.Higher Secondary school and two English medium primary school  named Jaffery English Medium school and Rangoli English medium school. Susan secondary and higher secondary school.

Economy
Kanodar's economy has historically been known for hand loom production and textiles especially by Muman(Momin) weavers; more recently, they have found a niche market in reconditioning jeeps.

References

 

Villages in Banaskantha district